Security through obscurity (or security by obscurity) is the reliance in security engineering on design or implementation secrecy as the main method of providing security to a system or component.

History
An early opponent of security through obscurity was the locksmith Alfred Charles Hobbs, who in 1851 demonstrated to the public how state-of-the-art locks could be picked. In response to concerns that exposing security flaws in the design of locks could make them more vulnerable to criminals, he said: "Rogues are very keen in their profession, and know already much more than we can teach them."

There is scant formal literature on the issue of security through obscurity. Books on security engineering cite Kerckhoffs' doctrine from 1883, if they cite anything at all. For example, in a discussion about secrecy and openness in Nuclear Command and Control:
[T]he benefits of reducing the likelihood of an accidental war were considered to outweigh the possible benefits of secrecy. This is a modern reincarnation of Kerckhoffs' doctrine, first put forward in the nineteenth century, that the security of a system should depend on its key, not on its design remaining obscure.

Peter Swire has written about the trade-off between the notion that "security through obscurity is an illusion" and the military notion that "loose lips sink ships", as well as on how competition affects the incentives to disclose.

There are conflicting stories about the origin of this term. Fans of MIT's Incompatible Timesharing System (ITS) say it was coined in opposition to Multics users down the hall, for whom security was far more an issue than on ITS. Within the ITS culture the term referred, self-mockingly, to the poor coverage of the documentation and obscurity of many commands, and to the attitude that by the time a tourist figured out how to make trouble he'd generally got over the urge to make it, because he felt part of the community. One instance of deliberate security through obscurity on ITS has been noted: the command to allow patching the running ITS system (altmode altmode control-R) echoed as $$^D. Typing Alt Alt Control-D set a flag that would prevent patching the system even if the user later got it right.

In January 2020, NPR reported that Democratic party officials in Iowa declined to share information regarding the security of its caucus app, to "make sure we are not relaying information that could be used against us." Cybersecurity experts replied that "to withhold the technical details of its app doesn't do much to protect the system."

Criticism 
Security by obscurity alone is discouraged and not recommended by standards bodies. The National Institute of Standards and Technology (NIST) in the United States sometimes recommends against this practice: "System security should not depend on the secrecy of the implementation or its components."

The technique stands in contrast with security by design and open security, although many real-world projects include elements of all strategies.

Obscurity in architecture vs. technique 
Knowledge of how the system is built differs from concealment and camouflage. The effectiveness of obscurity in operations security depends on whether the obscurity lives on top of other good security practices, or if it is being used alone. When used as an independent layer, obscurity is considered a valid security tool.

In recent years, more advanced versions of "security through obscurity" have gained support as a methodology in cybersecurity through Moving Target Defense and cyber deception. NIST's cyber resiliency framework, 800-160 Volume 2, recommends the usage of security through obscurity as a complementary part of a resilient and secure computing environment.

See also

 Steganography
 Code morphing
 Kerckhoffs' principle
 Need to know
 Obfuscated code
 Presumed security
 Secure by design
 AACS encryption key controversy
 Zero-day (computing)
 Code talker
 Obfuscation

References

External links
 Eric Raymond on Cisco's IOS source code 'release' v Open Source
 Computer Security Publications: Information Economics, Shifting Liability and the First Amendment by Ethan M. Preston and John Lofton
  by Jay Beale
 Secrecy, Security and Obscurity & The Non-Security of Secrecy by Bruce Schneier
 "Security through obsolescence", Robin Miller, linux.com, June 6, 2002

Computer security procedures
Cryptography
Secrecy